Dornan is a surname. Notable people with the surname include:

Alan Dornan (born 1962), Northern Irish footballer and manager
Andy Dornan (born 1961), Scottish footballer
Bob Dornan (born 1933), American politician
Dimity Dornan, Australian speech pathologist, author, and businesswoman
Henry Dornan (1916–1990), Scottish footballer 
James Dornan (born 1953), Scottish politician
Jamie Dornan (born 1982), Northern Irish actor, model, and musician
Jim Dornan (born 1948), Northern Irish obstetrician, gynecologist, and professor
John Dornan (1880–1959), American cricketer
Peter Dornan (born 1939), British physicist and professor 
Tim Dornan (born 1950), British physician, endocrinologist, and medical educationalist
William Dornan (c. 1895–1937), Scottish footballer